Postupalovo is a rural locality (a village) in Ivano-Kazansky Selsoviet, Iglinsky District, Bashkortostan, Russia. The population was 70 as of 2010. There are 2 streets.

Geography 
Postupalovo is located 25 km south of Iglino (the district's administrative centre) by road. Shelany is the nearest rural locality.

References 

Rural localities in Iglinsky District